Freihow is a surname. Notable people with the surname include:

Halvdan Wexelsen Freihow (1883–1965), Norwegian priest
Håkon Wexelsen Freihow (1927–2019), Norwegian diplomat
Halfdan W. Freihow (born 1959), Norwegian literary critic, novelist, editor, and book publisher